The  Thisavros Dam is a rock-fill dam on the Nestos River in the regional unit of Drama in the northeastern portion of Greece. it is  north of Nikiforos and  northeast of the town of Drama. It was constructed between 1986 and 1996. The purpose of the dam is irrigation and hydroelectric power production. The power station is a pumped-storage type which allows it to not only generate power but the turbines can reverse and pump water back into the reservoir. Power generation occurs during periods of high demand and pumping during those of low demand such as at night.

See also

 List of power stations in Greece
 Renewable energy in Greece

References

Dams completed in 1996
Energy infrastructure completed in 1996
Energy infrastructure completed in 1997
Dams in Greece
Pumped-storage hydroelectric power stations in Greece
Rock-filled dams
Buildings and structures in Drama (regional unit)
1997 establishments in Greece